Ernocornutia beta is a species of moth of the family Tortricidae. It is found in Peru.

The wingspan is 19 mm. The ground colour of the forewings is brownish cream and cream with yellowish brown suffusions. The basal blotch is cream and the markings are brownish. The hindwings are cream.

Etymology
The species name refers to the succession of the species.

References

Moths described in 2010
Euliini
Moths of South America
Taxa named by Józef Razowski